Take Our Daughters And Sons To Work Day, also termed Take Your Child to Work Day, is a national day that gives children in the United States a glimpse into the working world. Developed by the Take Our Daughters And Sons To Work Foundation, a 501(c)(3) non-profit educational organisation, the day revolves around parents taking their children to work to expose students to future job possibilities and the value of education. It is the successor to Take Our Daughters To Work Day, which was expanded to include boys in 2003. In the U.S., it occurs on the fourth Thursday in April every year.

The most recent Take Our Daughters And Sons To Work Day occurred on Thursday, April 28, 2022. In 2018, more than 37 million Americans at over 3.5 million workplaces participated.

History 
Take Our Daughters to Work Day was created in New York City in the summer of 1992 by the Ms. Foundation for Women and its president, Marie C. Wilson, the Women's foundation treasurer, Daren Ball, and with support from foundation founder Gloria Steinem. The first celebration took place on April 22, 1993, and has since been celebrated usually on the fourth Thursday of April in order for the 37 million children, parents, schools in over 3.5 million workplaces across the country, in addition to participants in over 200 countries around the world, to plan ahead for the annual event. The day has generally been scheduled on a day that is a school day for most children in the United States, and schools are provided with literature and encouraged to promote the program. Educators are provided with materials for incorporating career exploration into school curricula on the day before or after the event.

The program was officially expanded in 2003 to include boys; however, most companies that participated in the program had, since the beginning, allowed both boys and girls to participate, usually renaming it "Take Our Children to Work Day" or an equivalent. The program's official website states that the program was changed in order to provide both boys and girls with opportunities to explore careers at an age when they are more flexible in terms of gender roles. The Ms. Foundation also states that men who have hosted children have benefited from being seen as parental figures in addition to their roles as professionals, which can contribute to combating gender stereotypes as well.

Prior to the inclusion of boys, the Ms. Foundation contended that the program was designed to specifically address self-esteem issues unique to girls and initially resisted pressure to include boys. Much of this pressure came from educators who did not wish to include the event in their curriculum given that their male students were not encouraged to participate.

In 2007, upon becoming its own separate foundation, the Take Our Daughters and Sons to Work program was turned over to Carolyn McKecuen, a MacArthur Award recipient, who took effective control as its executive director before relocating to Elizabeth City, North Carolina, where it has remained since. Gloria Steinem continues to maintain a role with the Take Our Daughters and Sons to Work Foundation as a member of its board of directors.

Employees across the United States and around the world typically invite their own children or relatives to join them at work, but the program particularly encourages employees to invite children from residential programs or shelters who may not be exposed to many adults in skilled professions today.

See also
Job shadow
Take Our Kids to Work Day

References

External links 
Official homepage
Collection of articles regarding inclusion of boys as well as alternative events held prior to the Ms. Foundation event being expanded to include boys

Civil awareness days
Recurring events established in 1993
American culture
April observances
Holidays and observances by scheduling (nth weekday of the month)